In mathematics, Blattner's conjecture or Blattner's formula is a description of the discrete series representations of a general semisimple group G in terms of their restricted representations to a maximal compact subgroup K (their so-called K-types). It is named after Robert James Blattner, despite not being formulated as a conjecture by him.

Statement
Blattner's formula says that if a discrete series representation with infinitesimal character λ is restricted to a maximal compact subgroup K, then the representation of K with highest weight μ occurs with multiplicity

where
Q is the number of ways a vector can be written as a sum of non-compact positive roots
WK is the Weyl group of K
ρc is half the sum of the compact roots
ρn is half the sum of the non-compact roots
ε is the sign character of WK.

Blattner's formula is what one gets by formally restricting the Harish-Chandra character formula for a discrete series representation to the maximal torus of a maximal compact group. The problem in proving the Blattner formula is that this only gives the character on the regular elements of the maximal torus, and  one also needs to control its behavior on the singular elements. For non-discrete irreducible representations the formal restriction of Harish-Chandra's character formula need not give the decomposition under the maximal compact subgroup: for example, for the principal series representations of SL2 the character is identically zero on the non-singular elements of the maximal compact subgroup, but the representation is not zero on this subgroup. In this case the character is a distribution on the maximal compact subgroup with support on the singular elements.

History
Harish-Chandra orally attributed the conjecture to Robert James Blattner as a question Blattner raised, not a conjecture made by Blattner. Blattner did not publish it in any form.

Schmid (1972) proved Blattner's formula in some special cases.
 showed that Blattner's formula gave an upper bound for the multiplicities of K-representations,  proved Blattner's conjecture for groups whose symmetric space is Hermitian, and   proved Blattner's conjecture for linear semisimple groups. In Enright (1979) multiplicity formulae are given for the so-called mock-discrete series representations also.  used his ideas to obtain results on the construction and classification of irreducible Harish-Chandra modules of any real semisimple Lie algebra.

References

Representation theory of Lie groups
Conjectures